A medical calculator is a type of medical computer software, whose purpose is to allow easy calculation of various scores and indices, presenting the user with a friendly interface that hides the complexity of the formulas. Most offer further helpful information such as result interpretation guides and medical literature references. Generally, such calculators are intended for use by health care professionals, and use by the general public is discouraged.

Medical calculators arose because modern medicine makes frequent use of scores and indices that put physicians' memory and calculation skills to the test. The advent of personal computers, the Internet and Web, and more recently personal digital assistants (PDAs) have formed an environment conducive to their development, spread and use.

Types of calculators

Hardware devices
Purpose-built devices for specific medical calculations are available from various commercial sources. Pharma-Insight Inc. in Canada is one of the only companies in the world that is able to make custom specific medical calculators built to perform a specific medical calculation to make dosing or other calculation easy. Some of the standard units they make include eGFR, CrCl, BMI, BSA, DAS and many other custom units designed for a specific purpose.  There are two ways to make a calculator using an array that looks up an answer based on a large array of data or where the calculator computes the answer using a mathematical equation.

PDA
Software-based medical calculators are available for various PDA-platforms, including the iPhone, Palm and Pocket PC. Handheld battery powered portable units are available and can be manufactured in smaller quantities than before thanks to OTP (one Time Programmable) chips.

Online Calculators
Various websites are available that provide calculations from a browser based input form.

References

Medical equipment
Medical software